Arnaud Tattevin (born 26 February 2000) is a footballer who plays as a forward for French Championnat National club Borgo. Born in France, he plays for the Central African Republic national team.

Club career
In October 2020, Tattevin joined Paris FC. On 1 February 2022, he moved to Avranches. He joined Borgo in August 2022.

International career
Born in France, Tattevin represented France at youth level before switching allegiance to Central African Republic. As a youth international of France, he was part of their 2017 UEFA European Under-17 Championship qualification campaign and scored a goal in 7–0 win against Estonia.

In October 2019, Tattevin was named in Central African Republic squad for a friendly against Niger. He debuted with the Central African Republic in a friendly 5–0 loss to Rwanda on 8 June 2021.

Career statistics

International

References

External links
 

2000 births
Living people
Footballers from Paris
Association football forwards
Citizens of the Central African Republic through descent
Central African Republic footballers
Central African Republic  international footballers
French footballers
France youth international footballers
French sportspeople of Central African Republic descent
Paris FC players
US Avranches players
FC Bastia-Borgo players
Ligue 2 players
Championnat National players
Championnat National 2 players
Championnat National 3 players